Ambrose Everett Burnside Stephens (June 3, 1862 – February 12, 1927) was an American politician who served four terms as a U.S. Representative from Ohio from 1919 to 1927.

Early life and career 
Born in Crosby Township, Ohio, Stephens attended the public schools and Chickering's Institute of Cincinnati.  He studied law, was admitted to the bar in 1902 and commenced practice in Cincinnati.  He served as captain in the Ohio National Guard 1901–3 and colonel in 1910 and 1911.  He served as clerk of the Hamilton County Courts 1911–17.

Congress 
Stephens was elected as a Republican to the Sixty-sixth and to the three succeeding Congresses and served from March 4, 1919, until his death.  He had been re-elected to the Seventieth Congress.

Death
He died in North Bend, Ohio, February 12, 1927.  He was interred in Maple Grove Cemetery, Cleves, Ohio.

See also
List of United States Congress members who died in office (1900–49)

Sources

External links

1862 births
1927 deaths
People from Hamilton County, Ohio
National Guard (United States) officers
Ohio lawyers
19th-century American lawyers
Republican Party members of the United States House of Representatives from Ohio